30 Leonis Minoris is a single star in the northern constellation of Leo Minor. It is visible to the naked eye as a faint, white-hued point of light with an apparent visual magnitude of 4.72. The distance to this star, as estimated from parallax measurements, is 233 light years. It is drifting away from the Earth with a heliocentric radial velocity of +13.7 km/s.

This object has been catalogued as an Am star and was given a stellar classification of kF0hF2mF2 by Abt and Morrell (1995). This notation indicates the calcium K line matches an F0 star, while the hydrogen and metal lines fit an F2 star. However, Gray et al. (2001) assigned it a class of A9IIIa, matching an A-type giant star.

30 Leonis Minoris has 2.3 times the mass of the Sun and 4.2 times the Sun's radius. It has a moderate rate of spin, showing a projected rotational velocity of 34 km/s. The star is radiating 58 times the Sun's luminosity from its photosphere at an effective temperature of 7,292 K.

References

F-type main-sequence stars
Am stars
A-type giants
Leo Minor
BD+34 2128
Leonis Minoris, 30
090277
051056
4090